Qiantan International Business Zone (Shanghai) also called the New Bund, is a newly built International Business Zone in Qiantan, Pudong, Shanghai, China, lying to the south of the former Expo 2010 site next to  the Shanghai Oriental Sports Center. It is known as Shanghai's "second Lujiazui" as the Secondary Central business district developing close to Lujiazui.  It will be developed specifically as another new financial district of Shanghai, but will focus more on overall urban functionality.

See also

Lujiazui
The Bund
Xintiandi
Zhangjiang Hi-Tech Park

References

External links

Qiantan set to be hive of activity after completion Shanghai Daily. 2013-09-5
东方卫视新闻：上海前滩国际商务区基础设施全面完工 2012-11-25

Financial districts in China
Neighbourhoods of Shanghai
Special Economic Zones of China
Pudong
Commercial buildings completed in 2012
2012 establishments in China